The 2013–14 Sacramento Kings season is the 69th season of the franchise, and the 65th season in the National Basketball Association (NBA), and its 29th in Sacramento. It was also the first season under new owner, Vivek Ranadivé.

Key dates
 June 27, 2013: The 2013 NBA draft took place at Barclays Center in Brooklyn, New York.

Draft picks

Roster

Pre-season

|- style="background:#fcc;"
| 1
| October 7
| @ Golden State
| 
| Isaiah Thomas (15)
| Jason Thompson (9)
| Isaiah Thomas (6)
| Oracle Arena17,821
| 0–1
|- style="background:#cfc;"
| 2
| October 10
| @ L.A. Lakers
| 
| Travis Outlaw (18)
| DeMarcus Cousins (12)
| Isaiah Thomas (9)
| MGM Grand Garden Arena10,188
| 1–1
|- style="background:#cfc;"
| 3
| October 14
| L.A. Clippers
| 
| DeMarcus Cousins (31)
| Thompson & Cousins (11)
| Isaiah Thomas (5)
| Sleep Train Arena12,122
| 2–1
|- style="background:#cfc;"
| 4
| October 17
| Phoenix
| 
| DeMarcus Cousins (29)
| DeMarcus Cousins (9)
| Jimmer Fredette (5)
| Sleep Train Arena11,223
| 3–1
|- style="background:#fcc;"
| 5
| October 20
| @ Portland
| 
| Patrick Patterson (27)
| Chuck Hayes (11)
| Isaiah Thomas (10)
| Moda Center17,357
| 3–2
|- style="background:#cfc;"
| 6
| October 23
| Golden State
| 
| Isaiah Thomas (21)
| DeMarcus Cousins (9)
| Salmons, Fredette, Vásquez, Thomas (3)
| Sleep Train Arena12,260
| 4–2
|- style="background:#cfc;"
| 7
| October 25
| @ L.A. Clippers
| 
| Isaiah Thomas (27)
| Jason Thompson (8)
| Greivis Vásquez (12)
| Staples Center15,082
| 5–2

Regular season

Game log

|- style="background:#cfc;"
| 1
| October 30
| Denver
| 
| DeMarcus Cousins (30)
| DeMarcus Cousins (14)
| Isaiah Thomas (5)
| Sleep Train Arena17,317
| 1–0

|- style="background:#fcc;"
| 2
| November 1
| L.A. Clippers
| 
| Isaiah Thomas (29)
| DeMarcus Cousins (10)
| Cousins, Vásquez, Thomas (4)
| Sleep Train Arena17,317
| 1–1
|- style="background:#fcc;"
| 3
| November 2
| @ Golden State
| 
| Ben McLemore (19)
| Travis Outlaw (12)
| Isaiah Thomas (5)
| Oracle Arena19,596
| 1–2
|- style="background:#fcc;"
| 4
| November 5
| Atlanta
| 
| Isaiah Thomas (26)
| Patrick Patterson (9)
| Salmons & Thomas (5)
| Sleep Train Arena13,506
| 1–3
|- style="background:#fcc;"
| 5
| November 8
| @ Portland
| 
| DeMarcus Cousins (35)
| DeMarcus Cousins (9)
| Isaiah Thomas (7)
| Moda Center17,627
| 1–4
|- style="background:#fcc;"
| 6
| November 9
| Portland
| 
| DeMarcus Cousins (33)
| DeMarcus Cousins (12)
| Greivis Vásquez (5)
| Sleep Train Arena15,482
| 1–5
|- style="background:#cfc;"
| 7
| November 13
| Brooklyn
| 
| Marcus Thornton (24)
| Jason Thompson (11)
| Greivis Vásquez (12)
| Sleep Train Arena15,122
| 2–5
|- style="background:#fcc;"
| 8
| November 15
| Detroit
| 
| DeMarcus Cousins (26)
| DeMarcus Cousins (13)
| Isaiah Thomas (7)
| Sleep Train Arena17,317
| 2–6
|- style="background:#fcc;"
| 9
| November 17
| Memphis
| 
| Travis Outlaw (18)
| Ndiaye & Outlaw (6)
| John Salmons (5)
| Sleep Train Arena15,630
| 2–7
|- style="background:#cfc;"
| 10
| November 19
| Phoenix
| 
| DeMarcus Cousins (27)
| DeMarcus Cousins (12)
| Greivis Vásquez (6)
| Sleep Train Arena14,626
| 3–7
|- style="background:#cfc;"
| 11
| November 20
| @ Phoenix
| 
| Isaiah Thomas (23)
| DeMarcus Cousins (12)
| Greivis Vásquez (6)
| US Airways Center12,705
| 4–7
|- style="background:#fcc;"
| 12
| November 23
| @ L.A. Clippers
| 
| DeMarcus Cousins (23)
| DeMarcus Cousins (19)
| DeMarcus Cousins (7)
| Staples Center19,060
| 4–8
|- style="background:#fcc;"
| 13
| November 24
| @ L.A. Lakers
| 
| Greivis Vásquez (20)
| DeMarcus Cousins (8)
| DeMarcus Cousins (7)
| Staples Center18,997
| 4–9
|- style="background:#fcc;"
| 14
| November 29
| L.A. Clippers
| 
| DeMarcus Cousins (25)
| DeMarcus Cousins (9)
| Greivis Vásquez (7)
| Sleep Train Arena17,317
| 4–10

|- style="background:#fcc;"
| 15
| December 1
| Golden State
| 
| DeMarcus Cousins (24)
| Derrick Williams(7)
| Isaiah Thomas (8)
| Sleep Train Arena15,588
| 4–11
|- style="background:#fcc;"
| 16
| December 3
| Oklahoma City
| 
| Isaiah Thomas (24)
| Jason Thompson (10)
| Greivis Vásquez (7)
| Sleep Train Arena15,089
| 4–12
|- style="background:#fcc;"
| 17
| December 6
| L.A. Lakers
| 
| McLemore & Cousins (20)
| DeMarcus Cousins (11)
| Isaiah Thomas (9)
| Sleep Train Arena17,317
| 4–13
|- style="background:#cfc;"
| 18
| December 7
| @ Utah
| 
| DeMarcus Cousins (28)
| Ben McLemore (9)
| Isaiah Thomas (8)
| EnergySolutions Arena16,500
| 5–13
|- style="background:#cfc;"
| 19
| December 9
| Dallas
| 
| DeMarcus Cousins (32)
| DeMarcus Cousins (19)
| Isaiah Thomas (12)
| Sleep Train Arena15,329
| 6–13
|- style="background:#fcc;"
| 20
| December 11
| Utah
| 
| Isaiah Thomas (20)
| DeMarcus Cousins (11)
| Isaiah Thomas (7)
| Sleep Train Arena15,198
| 6–14
|- style="background:#fcc;"
| 21
| December 13
| @ Phoenix
| 
| Isaiah Thomas (29)
| DeMarcus Cousins (16)
| DeMarcus Cousins (5)
| US Airways Center14,128
| 6–15
|- style="background:#cfc;"
| 22
| December 15
| Houston
| 
| Rudy Gay (26)
| DeMarcus Cousins (10)
| Isaiah Thomas (8)
| Sleep Train Arena15,606
| 7–15
|- style="background:#fcc;"
| 23
| December 17
| @ Charlotte
| 
| DeMarcus Cousins (30)
| DeMarcus Cousins (17)
| DeMarcus Cousins (6)
| Time Warner Cable Arena11,339
| 7–16
|- style="background:#fcc;"
| 24
| December 18
| @ Atlanta
| 
| DeMarcus Cousins (28)
| Cousins & Thompson (7)
| Isaiah Thomas (10)
| Philips Arena10,185
| 7–17
|- style="background:#fcc;"
| 25
| December 20
| @ Miami
| 
| DeMarcus Cousins (27)
| DeMarcus Cousins (8)
| Isaiah Thomas (7)
| American Airlines Arena19,600
|  7–18
|- style="background:#cfc;"
| 26
| December 21
| @ Orlando
| 
| Gay & Thomas (23)
| DeMarcus Cousins (11)
| Isaiah Thomas (9)
| Amway Center14,283
| 8–18
|- style="background:#fcc;"
| 27
| December 23
| New Orleans
| 
| DeMarcus Cousins (24)
| DeMarcus Cousins (14)
| Isaiah Thomas (5)
| Sleep Train Arena17,317
| 8–19
|- style="background:#cfc;"
| 28
| December 27
| Miami
| 
| DeMarcus Cousins (27)
| DeMarcus Cousins (17)
| Isaiah Thomas (11)
| Sleep Train Arena17,317
| 9–19
|- style="background:#fcc;"
| 29
| December 29
| @ San Antonio
| 
| DeMarcus Cousins (29)
| DeMarcus Cousins (14)
| Isaiah Thomas (9)
| AT&T Center18,581
| 9–20
|- style="background:#cfc;"
| 30
| December 31
| @ Houston
| 
| Rudy Gay (25)
| DeMarcus Cousins (16)
| Isaiah Thomas (10)
| Toyota Center18,232
| 10–20

|- style="background:#fcc;"
| 31
| January 2
| Philadelphia
| 
| DeMarcus Cousins (33)
| DeMarcus Cousins (14)
| Isaiah Thomas (7)
| Sleep Train Arena16,259
| 10–21
|- style="background:#fcc;"
| 32
| January 4
| Charlotte
| 
| DeMarcus Cousins (26)
| Jason Thompson (14)
| Isaiah Thomas (8)
| Sleep Train Arena16,410
| 10–22
|- style="background:#cfc;"
| 33
| January 7
| Portland
| 
| DeMarcus Cousins (35)
| DeMarcus Cousins (13)
| Isaiah Thomas (8)
| Sleep Train Arena15,518
| 11–22
|- style="background:#cfc;"
| 34
| January 10
| Orlando
| 
| DeMarcus Cousins (24)
| DeMarcus Cousins (14)
| Isaiah Thomas (7)
| Sleep Train Arena15,694
| 12–22
|- style="background:#cfc;"
| 35
| January 12
| Cleveland
| 
| Isaiah Thomas (26)
| Jason Thompson (16)
| Isaiah Thomas (6)
| Sleep Train Arena16,072
| 13–22
|- style="background:#fcc;"
| 36
| January 14
| @ Indiana
| 
| DeMarcus Cousins (31)
| DeMarcus Cousins (13)
| Jimmer Fredette (4)
| Bankers Life Fieldhouse17,530
| 13–23
|- style="background:#cfc;"
| 37
| January 15
| @ Minnesota
| 
| Rudy Gay (33)
| DeMarcus Cousins (11)
| Isaiah Thomas (7)
| Target Center12,399
| 14–23
|- style="background:#fcc;"
| 38
| January 17
| @ Memphis
| 
| DeMarcus Cousins (22)
| DeMarcus Cousins (17)
| Isaiah Thomas (9)
| FedExForum17,212
| 14–24
|- style="background:#fcc;"
| 39
| January 19
| @ Oklahoma City
| 
| Isaiah Thomas (38)
| DeMarcus Cousins (14)
| Isaiah Thomas (6)
| Chesapeake Energy Arena18,203
| 14–25
|-  style="background:#cfc;"
| 40
| January 21
| @ New Orleans
| 
| Rudy Gay (41)
| DeMarcus Cousins (11)
| Isaiah Thomas (11)
| New Orleans Arena16,459
| 15–25
|- style="background:#fcc;"
| 41
| January 22
| @ Houston
| 
| Derrick Williams (22)
| Derrick Williams (11)
| Isaiah Thomas (6)
| Toyota Center16,488
| 15–26
|- style="background:#fcc;"
| 42
| January 24
| Indiana
| 
| Marcus Thornton (42)
| Derrick Williams (11)
| Isaiah Thomas (6)
| Sleep Train Arena17,317
| 15–27
|- style="background:#fcc;"
| 43
| January 26
| Denver
| 
| Isaiah Thomas (22)
| Jason Thompson (10)
| Isaiah Thomas (8)
| Sleep Train Arena15,939
| 15–28
|- style="background:#fcc;"
| 44
| January 27
| @ Utah
| 
| Jason Thompson (19)
| Derrick Williams (15)
| Isaiah Thomas (6)
| EnergySolutions Arena16,663
| 15–29
|- style="background:#fcc;"
| 45
| January 29
| Memphis
| 
| Isaiah Thomas (24)
| Jason Thompson (7)
| Gay & Thomas (5)
| Sleep Train Arena15,195
| 15–30
|- style="background:#fcc;"
| 46
| January 31
| @ Dallas
| 
| Rudy Gay (35)
| Rudy Gay (12)
| Gay & Thomas (6)
| American Airlines Center19,614
| 15–31

|- style="background:#fcc;"
| 47
| February 1
| @ San Antonio
| 
| Isaiah Thomas (26)
| Quincy Acy (10)
| Rudy Gay (6)
| AT&T Center18,581
| 15–32
|- style="background:#cfc;"
| 48
| February 3
| Chicago
| 
| DeMarcus Cousins (25)
| DeMarcus Cousins (16)
| Cousins & Fredette (4)
| Sleep Train Arena15,178
| 16–32
|- style="background:#cfc;"
| 49
| February 5
| Toronto
| 
| DeMarcus Cousins (25)
| Cousins, Gay & Thompson (10)
| Isaiah Thomas (5)
| Sleep Train Arena17,317
| 17–32
|- style="background:#fcc;"
| 50
| February 7
| @ Boston
| 
| DeMarcus Cousins (31)
| DeMarcus Cousins (16)
| Isaiah Thomas (6)
| TD Garden18,624
| 17–33
|- style="background:#fcc;"
| 51
| February 9
| @ Washington
| 
| Isaiah Thomas (30)
| DeMarcus Cousins (12)
| Isaiah Thomas (8)
| Verizon Center18,173
| 17–34
|- style="background:#fcc;"
| 52
| February 11
| @ Cleveland
| 
| DeMarcus Cousins (21)
| DeMarcus Cousins (10)
| Isaiah Thomas (8)
| Quicken Loans Arena14,245
| 17–35
|- style="background:#cfc;"
| 53
| February 12
| @ New York
| 
| Jimmer Fredette (24)
| DeMarcus Cousins (14)
| Isaiah Thomas (7)
| Madison Square Garden19,812
| 18–35
|- align="center"
|colspan="9" bgcolor="#bbcaff"|All-Star Break
|- style="background:#fcc;"
| 54
| February 19
| Golden State
| 
| Isaiah Thomas (26)
| Quincy Acy (12)
| Isaiah Thomas (7)
| Sleep Train Arena17,317
| 18–36
|- style="background:#cfc;"
| 55
| February 22
| Boston
| 
| Rudy Gay (22)
| Cousins & Gay (7)
| Isaiah Thomas (12)
| Sleep Train Arena17,317
| 19–36
|- style="background:#cfc;"
| 56
| February 23
| @ Denver
| 
| Isaiah Thomas (33)
| Rudy Gay (11)
| Isaiah Thomas (6)
| Pepsi Center16,263
| 20–36
|- style="background:#fcc;"
| 57
| February 25
| Houston
| 
| Rudy Gay (25)
| Reggie Evans (8)
| Rudy Gay (6)
| Sleep Train Arena16,057
| 20–37
|- style="background:#fcc;"
| 58
| February 28
| @ L.A. Lakers
| 
| Rudy Gay (32)
| Derrick Williams (12)
| Isaiah Thomas (8)
| Staples Center18,997
| 20–38

|- style="background:#fcc;"
| 59
| March 1
| Minnesota
| 
| Rudy Gay (24)
| DeMarcus Cousins (17)
| Isaiah Thomas (8)
| Sleep Train Arena17,085
| 20–39
|- style="background:#cfc;"
| 60
| March 3
| New Orleans
| 
| DeMarcus Cousins (23)
| Reggie Evans (13)
| Isaiah Thomas (5)
| Sleep Train Arena16,225
| 21–39
|- style="background:#cfc;"
| 61
| March 5
| @ Milwaukee
| 
| Isaiah Thomas (25)
| Jason Thompson (13)
| Gay & Thomas (6)
| BMO Harris Bradley Center11,079
| 22–39
|- style="background:#fcc;"
| 62
| March 7
| @ Toronto
| 
| DeMarcus Cousins (24)
| Reggie Evans (10)
| Isaiah Thomas (5)
| Air Canada Centre18,188
| 22–40
|- style="background:#fcc;"
| 63
| March 9
| @ Brooklyn
| 
| DeMarcus Cousins (28)
| DeMarcus Cousins (20)
| Isaiah Thomas (4)
| Barclays Center17,732
| 22–41
|- style="background:#fcc;"
| 64
| March 11
| @ Detroit
| 
| Rudy Gay (20)
| DeMarcus Cousins (14)
| Isaiah Thomas (8)
| Palace of Auburn Hills15,234
| 22–42
|- style="background:#cfc;"
| 65
| March 12
| @ Philadelphia
| 
| Rudy Gay (27)
| DeMarcus Cousins (12)
| Isaiah Thomas (6)
| Wells Fargo Center11,109
| 23-42
|- style="background:#fcc;"
| 66
| March 15
| @ Chicago
| 
| Isaiah Thomas (26)
| DeMarcus Cousins (14)
| Isaiah Thomas (5)
| United Center22,012
| 23-43
|- style="background:#fcc;"
| 67
| March 16
| @ Minnesota
| 
| Isaiah Thomas (27)
| Derrick Williams (11)
| Isaiah Thomas (7)
| Target Center13,171
| 23-44
|- style="background:#cfc;"
| 68
| March 18
| Washington
| 
| Gay, Cousins & Thomas (24)
| DeMarcus Cousins (14)
| Isaiah Thomas (10)
| Sleep Train Arena16,084
| 24–44
|- style="background:#fcc;"
| 69
| March 21
| San Antonio
| 
| Isaiah Thomas (18)
| DeMarcus Cousins (13)
| DeMarcus Cousins (5)
| Sleep Train Arena17,317
| 24–45
|- style="background:#cfc;"
| 70
| March 23
| Milwaukee
| 
| DeMarcus Cousins (32)
| DeMarcus Cousins (12)
| Isaiah Thomas (8)
| Sleep Train Arena16,341
| 25–45
|- style="background:#fcc;"
| 71
| March 26
| New York
| 
| DeMarcus Cousins (32)
| DeMarcus Cousins (15)
| DeMarcus Cousins (8)
| Sleep Train Arena15,594
| 25–46
|- style="background:#fcc;"
| 72
| March 28
| @ Oklahoma City
| 
| Ben McLemore (18)
| Jason Thompson (14)
| Ray McCallum, Jr. (5)
| Chesapeake Energy Arena18,203
| 25–47
|- style="background:#fcc;"
| 73
| March 29
| @ Dallas
| 
| Rudy Gay (30)
| Reggie Evans (18)
| Ray McCallum, Jr. (8)
| American Airlines Center20,210
| 25–48
|- style="background:#cfc;"
| 74
| March 31
| @ New Orleans
| 
| DeMarcus Cousins (35)
| DeMarcus Cousins (14)
| Ray McCallum, Jr. (10)
| Smoothie King Center15,548
| 26–48

|- style="background:#cfc;"
| 75
| April 2
| L.A. Lakers
| 
| Rudy Gay (31)
| Jason Thompson (12)
| Ray McCallum, Jr. (5)
| Sleep Train Arena17,317
| 27–48
|- style="background:#fcc;"
| 76
| April 4
| @ Golden State
| 
| DeMarcus Cousins (19)
| DeMarcus Cousins (11)
| Ray McCallum, Jr. (10)
| Oracle Arena19,596
| 27–49
|- style="background:#fcc;"
| 77
| April 6
| Dallas
| 
| Rudy Gay (32)
| DeMarcus Cousins (10)
| Ray McCallum, Jr. (9)
| Sleep Train Arena17,023
| 27–50
|- style="background:#fcc;"
| 78
| April 8
| Oklahoma City
| 
| Cousins & Outlaw (24)
| DeMarcus Cousins (14)
| Ray McCallum, Jr. (5)
| Sleep Train Arena16,696
| 27–51
|- style="background:#fcc;"
| 79
| April 9
| @ Portland
| 
| DeMarcus Cousins (30)
| DeMarcus Cousins (12)
| Ray McCallum, Jr. (8)
| Moda Center20,002
| 27–52
|- style="background:#fcc;"
| 80
| April 12
| @ L.A. Clippers
| 
| DeMarcus Cousins (32)
| Reggie Evans (14)
| Ray McCallum, Jr. (8)
| Staples Center19,060
| 27–53
|- style="background:#cfc;"
| 81
| April 13
| Minnesota
| 
| DeMarcus Cousins (35)
| DeMarcus Cousins (15)
| McLemore & Cousins (6)
| Sleep Train Arena16,965
| 28–53
|- style="background:#fcc;"
| 82
| April 16
| Phoenix
| 
| Ben McLemore (31)
| Aaron Gray (13)
| Ben McLemore (5)
| Sleep Train Arena17,317
| 28–54

Standings

Transactions

Overview

References

Sacramento Kings seasons
Sacramento Kings
Sacramento
Sacramento